Polyarnaya Zvezda, Russian for "Polar Star", may refer to:
Polar Star (Decembrist journal)
Polar Bear (schooner), a ship known as the Polyarnaya Zvezda after its purchase by the Soviet Union in 1925.

, a literary magazine in Yakutia, Russia